Elias: The Little Rescue Boat is a children's book published in Norway in 1999. It was later adapted into an animated television show and two movies.

The television show originally ran from 2005 to 2008. 39 episodes of the children's show have aired with a further 52 episodes broadcast on NRK Super starting in 2014.

The first film was released in 2007 titled "Elias og kongeskipet" ("Elias & The Royal Yacht"), and the second in 2010, "Elias og jakten på havets gull" ("Elias & The Treasure Of The Sea").

The Norwegian Society for Sea Rescue has adopted Elias as their mascot.

Plot
The book and the animations all revolve around a cast of anthropomorphic items such as cars, boats, and houses.

Episodes

Season 1 (2005)

Season 2 (2008)

Unknown episodes

2007 film

Elias and the Royal Yacht was released in 2007 and directed by Espen Fyksen and Lise I. Osvoll. This film featured the voices of, among others, Per Christian Ellefsen and Ane Dahl Torp.

2010 film 

Elias and the Treasure of the Sea was released in 2010 and directed by Lise I. Osvoll. This film features the voices of, among others, Atle Antonsen and Dennis Storhøi. In this movie, the little rescue boat Elias and all his friends are looking forward to the annual fishing season, but industrial fishing vessels are threatening to destroy the livelihood of the entire village.

References

External links 

Official website "Elias Kids"

1999 children's books
Norwegian animated television series
Television shows based on books
2005 Norwegian television series debuts
2000s Norwegian television series
2008 Norwegian television series endings
2000s animated television series
Animated preschool education television series
2000s preschool education television series